USAT may refer to:

USA Today, national daily newspaper
 USIM Application Toolkit, a standard which enables the USIM to initiate actions which can be used for various value-added services delivered to 3G mobile devices (USAT is the equivalent of STK for 3G cellular networks)
 United States Army Transport, a designation given to United States Army troop transports; the abbreviation is placed before the name of the ship
 USA Triathlon, the national governing body for the multi-sport disciplines of triathlon, duathlon, aquathlon and winter triathlon in the United States
 UNIQUE-SAT, a special case of the Boolean Satisfiability problem  (Computer Science)